Peaked Hill is a mountain in Dukes County, Massachusetts. Prospect Hill is located northwest of Peaked Hill.

References

Mountains of Massachusetts
Mountains of Dukes County, Massachusetts